Ahmed Hassan Diria (July 13, 1937 – March 13, 2005) was a Somali Tanzanian politician and diplomat. He was born in Raha Leo, Zanzibar and was educated in local primary and secondary schools. He started working in government service in 1954, with a three-year period of study at the College of Philosophy in Ghana.

Following the Zanzibar Revolution of 1964, he was appointed the area commissioner for Pemba. He remained in this position until 1965, when he joined the Tanzanian foreign service.

He was the ambassador to Congo from 1970 to 1972; the high commissioner of New Delhi, India from 1971 to 1978; the ambassador to Japan from 1979 to 1984; and the ambassador to Germany in 1984.

After his foreign service, he moved back to Tanzania to become a member of parliament and held various positions as minister.

In 1989 he joined the Tanzanian cabinet, serving as minister of information and broadcasting from 1989 to 1994, and foreign minister from 1990 to 1993. Meanwhile, he was elected to Parliament from Raha Leo and served in Parliament until his death. He died in a hospital in Germany.

References 

1937 births
2005 deaths
Zanzibari people
Tanzanian Muslims
Chama Cha Mapinduzi MPs
Foreign ministers of Tanzania
Members of the National Assembly (Tanzania)
Ambassadors of Tanzania to the Democratic Republic of the Congo
Ambassadors of Tanzania to Egypt
High Commissioners of Tanzania to India
Ambassadors of Tanzania to Japan
Ambassadors of Tanzania to Germany